Diocese and Archdiocese of Saint-Paul may refer to the following Latin Catholic jurisdictions, with different sees:

 the present Roman Catholic Diocese of Saint Paul, Alberta, in Canada
 the present Roman Catholic Archdiocese of Saint Paul and Minneapolis, in the USA
 the former Ancient Diocese of Saint-Paul-Trois-Châteaux, in feudal France